The Sun Is Also a Star is a 2019 American teen drama film directed by Ry Russo-Young and written by Tracy Oliver, based on the young adult novel of the same name by Nicola Yoon. The film stars Yara Shahidi, Charles Melton, and John Leguizamo, and follows a young couple who fall in love, while one of their families faces deportation.

It was theatrically released in the United States on May 17, 2019, by Warner Bros. Pictures and Metro-Goldwyn-Mayer Pictures. The film received mixed reviews from critics and grossed $6.8 million worldwide.

Plot

Teen Natasha Kingsley lives in NYC with her parents and brother, all of whom are illegal. The day before their deportation to Jamaica, she tearfully pleas their case in the immigration office. She is given contact info for Jeremy Martinez, who does pro bono work for such cases. Contacting his office, after pleading she is can see him for 15 minutes during his lunch break.

As Daniel Bae is preparing for an interview for Dartmouth, he writes “Deus ex Machina” into his notebook. Korean, his parents have always pushed him to become a doctor. His brother, Charles, is dismissive and rude.

Daniel and his friend Omar get on the same delayed subway car as Natasha. The conductor reassures the passengers that everything is fine and tells them about his friend who would have died in the 9/11 attacks had he not missed a train and been on time that day at the WTC. He tells them to “open your heart to destiny.” 

When Daniel and Omar get off at Grand Central Station, Daniel notices Natasha staring at the ceiling of the main lobby. When he sees her jacket, with “Deus ex machina,” on the back, he decides to follow her.

When Daniel sees a car crash into a cyclist, he saves Natasha from being hit. Shaken, they sit down and talk. She asks Daniel about his notebook, which he says is filled with poetry. Natasha dismisses love poems, as she doesn’t believe in it. Daniel proposes he can make her fall in love with him in one day, then suddenly a call moves his interview ahead one day. Suddenly free, Daniel tells Natasha about a love experiment in which couples ask each other a series of intimate questions, then stare into each other’s eyes in silence for four minutes. They agree to answer several questions from the study.

Daniel escorts Natasha to Jeremy’s office, in the same building where Daniel will have his interview. She is told by his assistant that he got hit by a car while biking (the same car that almost hit Natasha) and is in the hospital, so their meeting is pushed to 4:30. Natasha continues to hang out with Daniel.

Stopping by Daniel’s parents' black haircare shop, he's embarrassed by both his brother Charles and his father. They go to a planetarium and a Korean karaoke bar, where Daniel sings “Crimson and Clover” to her. Natasha imagines their life together, and they share their first kiss. Suddenly remembering her appointment with Jeremy, she rushes out, upset. Daniel chases after her, so she reveals their deportation. She meets with Jeremy Martinez, who offers to set up a new trial for their case for the next day.

Daniel goes back to his parents’ shop, getting into a fight with Charles. Shortly afterwards, Natasha enters and asks for Daniel’s number. Seeing that she really likes him, Charles gives it to her. Natasha and Daniel reunite, take the cable car to Roosevelt Island, and spend the night outside together.

The next morning, Daniel interviews for Dartmouth with Jeremy Martinez in his office. Natasha barges in for her case's verdict, and they realize his interviewer is her lawyer. She is told her case was rejected, and her whole family must leave the country that day, so she angrily leaves. Daniel cuts the interview short to go after her. He walks her home and meets her family before they head to the airport.

There, Daniel and Natasha complete the last part of the experiment, staring deeply into each others eyes for four minutes. As they are gazing, Natasha is shown returning to Jamaica and going to school, while Daniel attends Hunter College instead and works in a restaurant. When the time is up, Natasha tells Daniel she loves him. He tearfully says his experiment worked.

Five years later, Natasha has returned to NYC on her way to San Francisco for grad school. She meets Jeremy in the same coffee shop where she'd been with Daniel. She learns Jeremy had married the doctor who treated him for his bicycle crash on the day they met. Natasha asks him about Daniel, but he hasn’t seen him again. Jeremy leaves, Natasha prepares to go when she hears Daniel’s voice, about to read a poem. She spins to see him, and he asks to spend time with her. Natasha tells Daniel she has only an hour, and they kiss.

Cast

 Yara Shahidi as Natasha Kingsley
 Hill Harper as Lester Barnes
 Charles Melton as Daniel Jae Ho Bae
 Gbenga Akinnagbe as Samuel Kingsley
 Jake Choi as Charles Bae
 John Leguizamo as Jeremy Martinez
 Anais Lee as Young Natasha
 Miriam A. Hyman as Patricia Kingsley
 Jordan Williams as Peter Kingsley
 Keong Sim as Dae Hyun Bae
 Cathy Shim as Min Soo Bae
 Shamika Cotton as Hannah
 Camrus Johnson as Omar Hassabala

Production
Filming began on June 19, 2018. In June, Camrus Johnson was cast to play Omar in the film, and on June 29, 2018, Miriam A. Hyman also joined the cast, as Natasha's mother Mrs. Kingsley, a hard-working Jamaican-born waitress who is resigned to her family's imminent deportation. In July 2018, Cathy Shim was cast to play Min Soo Bae, a Korean immigrant in the film.

Herdis Stefánsdóttir composed the score for the film, while Dustin O'Halloran served as score producer. The soundtrack was released at Sony Classical.

Reception

Box office
The Sun Is Also a Star grossed $5 million in the United States and Canada, and $1.8 million in other territories, for a worldwide total of $6.8 million, against a production budget of $9 million.

In the United States and Canada, the film was released on May 17, 2019 alongside John Wick: Chapter 3 – Parabellum and A Dog's Journey, and was initially projected to gross $6–12 million from 2,037 theaters in its opening weekend. However, after making $1 million on its first Friday, estimates were lowered to $3 million. It ended up debuting to $2.5 million, one of the worst-ever openings for a film playing in over 2,000 theaters.

Critical response
The website's critical consensus reads: "The Sun Is Also a Star has a pair of easy-to-love leads, but tests the audience's affection with a storyline that strains credulity past the breaking point." On Metacritic, the film has a weighted average score of 52 out of 100, based on 25 critics, indicating "mixed or average reviews". Audiences polled by CinemaScore gave the film an average grade of "B−" on an A+ to F scale, while those at PostTrak gave it 2.5 out of 5 stars.

Amy Nicholson of Variety wrote: "this crowd-pleaser convinces us to spend one day savoring an American Dream."

References

External links
 

2019 films
2010s teen drama films
American teen drama films
Alloy Entertainment films
2010s English-language films
Films about immigration to the United States
Films about interracial romance
Films based on American novels
Films based on young adult literature
Films set in New York City
Metro-Goldwyn-Mayer films
Warner Bros. films
2019 drama films
2010s American films
African-American films